Luis Arturo González López (21 December 1900 – 11 November 1965) was a politician in Guatemala and the acting President of Guatemala from 27 July 1957 to 24 October 1957.

Biography
Born in the town of Zacapa, González López studied law, and served as a judge in several cities. He was a member of the Supreme Court for seven years from 1945 to 1951, before being removed: reports stated that he was removed due to pressure from the communist parties. He was appointed Vice-President to Carlos Castillo Armas in 1957. On 26 July 1957, Castillo Armas was shot dead in the Guatemalan capital by a member of the presidential guard. González López held the position of "First Presidential Designate", and was sworn in as interim president on 27 July.

Supporters of Castillo Armas were considering forming a military junta and seizing power, but were dissuaded by Edwin J. Sparks. the U.S. ambassador to Guatemala. The U.S. government preferred to preserve a facade of democracy, rather than have Guatemala revert to a blatant dictatorship. Elections were held in October 1957, complicated by pressure from the U.S. government, the government of Dominica, and the army.

The centrist Miguel Ortiz Passarelli won a plurality in these elections, but supporters of Miguel Ydígoras Fuentes, who had also been a candidate in the election, rioted. The Guatemalan government declared martial law for a period of 30 days. On 24 October, a group of 80 military officers marched into the Presidential palace and replaced González López with a three-person junta led by army Colonel Óscar Mendoza Azurdia. New elections were held in January 1958. Ydígoras Fuentes comfortably won this election and seized power for himself soon after.

References
Notes

Sources
 
 
 

1900 births
1965 deaths
People from Zacapa Department
Guatemalan people of Spanish descent
Presidents of Guatemala
Vice presidents of Guatemala
20th-century Guatemalan judges
Presidents of the Congress of Guatemala